Sémeries is a commune in the Nord department in northern France.

Sémeries sits in the valley of the Helpe Majeure in the Avesnois Regional Park in an area called the little Switzerland of the North.

History
The rights of the village were given in 1095 by Thierry d'Avesnes to Abbey Liessies who retained it until the French Revolution.

Heraldry

See also
Communes of the Nord department

References

Communes of Nord (French department)